The 2012 VCU Rams men's soccer team was the 33rd season of Virginia Commonwealth University in Richmond, Virginia fielding a men's varsity college soccer program. The team played their inaugural season in the Atlantic 10 Conference of the NCAA Division I after playing the previous 17 seasons in the Colonial Athletic Association.

After an eight-year absence, the Rams returned to the NCAA Division I Men's Soccer Tournament, securing an at-large bid, and being one of the 16 seeded teams, earning a fourteen seed and a bye to the second round. In their return to the NCAA Tournament, VCU lost through an overtime golden goal to unseeded Syracuse, losing 2–3. In the 2012 Atlantic 10 Men's Soccer Tournament, VCU upset Charlotte and played Saint Louis in the final, losing 3–0.

Background 

The team is coming off an 11–9–0 record from 2011, where they were the only team in the country to have both a winning conference and overall record, and not qualify for their conference tournament. By a tiebreaker against Georgia State, the Rams finished seventh in their conference, missing out on the 2012 CAA Men's Soccer Tournament. Their season, however, began in impressive fashion, coming out with a 5–0–0 record, good enough to be ranked as high as sixteenth in the nation at one point. The five-match winning streak, saw the Rams drop their next four matches.

Review

Team

Roster 

As of September 19, 2012

Coaching staff

Competitions 
Key

Spring 2012 season

Preseason

Regular season

A-10 standings

Results summary

Results by round

Match reports 

Home team on the right, away team on the left.

Atlantic 10 Tournament

NCAA Tournament

Statistics

Appearances and goals 

Last updated on October 16, 2012.

|}

Transfers and recruits

See also 
 Virginia Commonwealth University
 VCU Rams
 VCU Rams men's soccer
 NCAA Division I Men's Soccer Championship
 CAA Men's Soccer Tournament

References 

2012
VCU Rams
Vcu Rams
VCU Rams
VCU Rams